Mohammed Faritz bin Abdul Hameed (born 16 January 1990) is a Singaporean professional footballer who plays as a right-back for S.League club Tanjong Pagar United and the Singapore national team.

Club career

Faritz began his career with Young Lions in the S.League in 2009, playing four seasons for the club.

In January 2013, he was named in the LionsXII squad for the 2013 Malaysia Super League. He made his debut and first start in a MSL match against ATM on 9 January 2013. Faritz played a further 15 games at the right side of defence as LionsXII finished league winners.

In January 2016, it was announced that Faritz would join Geylang International for the 2016 S.League campaign after the LionsXII was disbanded in 2015.

Faritz joined Tanjong Pagar United FC in 2021 for the 2022 Singapore Premier League season.

International career
Faritz was in the Singapore national under-23 football team that won the bronze medal at the 2009 and 2013 Southeast Asian Games.

Faritz made his senior team debut in a friendly match against Myanmar on 6 June 2013. He assisted Khairul Amri opening goal with a cross from the right flank.

In 2014, Faritz was not selected for the 2014 AFF Championship due to a knee injury.

Others

Singapore Selection Squad
He was selected as part of the Singapore Selection squad for The Sultan of Selangor’s Cup to be held on 6 May 2017.

Career statistics

Club
. Caps and goals may not be correct.

 Young Lions and LionsXII are ineligible for qualification to AFC competitions in their respective leagues.
 Young Lions withdrew from the 2011 and 2012 Singapore Cup, and the 2011 Singapore League Cup due to participation in AFC and AFF youth competitions.

Honours

Club
Young Lions
RHB Cup: 2011
LionsXII
Malaysia Super League: 2013
Malaysia FA Cup: 2015
Geylang International
Plate League Cup Champions: 2016

International
Singapore
Southeast Asian Games: 2009 (bronze)
Southeast Asian Games: 2013 (bronze)

References

1990 births
Living people
Singaporean footballers
Singapore international footballers
Singapore Premier League players
LionsXII players
Singaporean people of Malay descent
Association football fullbacks
Malaysia Super League players
Young Lions FC players
Footballers at the 2010 Asian Games
Southeast Asian Games bronze medalists for Singapore
Southeast Asian Games medalists in football
Competitors at the 2009 Southeast Asian Games
Competitors at the 2013 Southeast Asian Games
Asian Games competitors for Singapore